"Numb" is a song by Australian singer Hayden James featuring Sydney-based vocalist Graace. It was released on 6 October 2017 as the lead single from James' debut studio album Between Us (2019). The song has peaked at number 48 on the ARIA Singles Chart.

Critical reception
Anmplify said: "'Numb' is a captivating arrangement of velvety vocals, punctuated by crafty synthesisers and an addictive bass line. The refined track begins slow with a buoyant melody, only to build into an infectious jam, dripping with emotion."

Track listing
Digital download
 "Numb" – 3:37

Digital download
 "Numb" – 3:37
 "Numb" (Friend Within remix) – 5:18
 "Numb" (Pluko remix) – 3:34

Charts

Certifications

References

2017 singles
2017 songs
Hayden James songs
Graace songs
Songs written by Hayden James